The MTV Video Music Award for Best Overall Performance in a Video was first given out at the first annual MTV Video Music Awards in 1984.  The last of this award was given out in 1987.

Winners

References 

MTV Video Music Awards
Awards established in 1984
Awards disestablished in 1987